Ole Robert Reitan (born 5 October 1971) is a Norwegian businessman. He is a son of merchant Odd Reitan, and co-owner of REITAN AS, along with his father and brother. He is the CEO of Reitan Retail, which includes the business areas REMA 1000 Norway, REMA 1000 Denmark, Reitan Convenience and Uno-X Mobility. Ole Robert Reitan has been director of Reitan Narvesen and of the franchise supermarket chain Rema 1000.

References

1971 births
Living people
People from Trondheim
Norwegian businesspeople in retailing